USS Malvern may refer to the following ships of the United States Navy:

 was built in 1860 as William G. Hewes and served the Union Navy
 was a tug commissioned 27 April 1917 and returned to her owner On 16 January 1919
 was acquired by the U.S. Navy 11 May 1944 and decommissioned 16 February 1946
 was commissioned 26 September 1942 and transferred to Indonesia 17 March 1960

United States Navy ship names